Saint Joseph's University Press is a university press publishing house that is part of Saint Joseph's University in Philadelphia, Pennsylvania. The press currently publishes over 38 books, two journals, and a large number of other publications. The press lists its publication interests as Early Modern Catholicism and the Visual Arts, Christian Iconography, Jesuit Studies, Spanish Colonial Art, and the City of Philadelphia. The university itself is also a topic of one book. The press also publishes the weekly school newspaper, The Hawk. SJUP is located at 5600 City Avenue in Philadelphia and is a founding member of the Association of Jesuit University Presses (AJUP).

See also

 List of English-language book publishing companies
 List of university presses

References

External links
Saint Joseph's University Press website

Saint Joseph's University
Association of Jesuit University Presses
University presses of the United States
Book publishing companies based in Pennsylvania